Ryan Blair (born July 14, 1977) is an American entrepreneur and author. He is the former co-founder and chief executive officer of the multi-level marketing company ViSalus Sciences, a subsidiary of the publicly traded company Blyth, Inc.

In 2011, he wrote a book titled Nothing to Lose, Everything to Gain: How I Went from Gang Member to Multimillionaire Entrepreneur which reached The New York Times Best Seller list for hardcover business books. Ernst & Young named Blair as Entrepreneur of the Year in 2012.

Early life
Blair was raised in Southern California. A product of a broken family, at the early age of 13, "he was already heavily 'involved in stuff' after his father succumbed to drug addiction," Blair tells Business Insider in an interview. He dropped out of high school in the 9th grade, left home, and became a gang member in his home-town of Los Angeles. 

When he was 18, Blair's mother began dating a successful real-estate entrepreneur who became Blair's mentor and gave him his first job at Logix Development, a computer technical support provider. At age 21, after serving as vice president of Logix Development he founded the technical-support firm 24/7 Tech.

Business and writing
In 2005, Blair became the CEO of the multi-level marketing company ViSalus Sciences.

In 2008, ViSalus was in debt and facing bankruptcy. That year the company was acquired by Blyth Inc., with Blair remaining as CEO.  

In 2010, Blair won the DSN Global Turn Around Award "when he actually turned the company around from a $6 million debt in early 2008 to $150 million in revenue 16 months later." 

In 2011, Blair released an autobiography, Nothing to Lose, Everything to Gain: How I Went from Gang Member to Multimillionaire Entrepreneur. The book was ranked 3rd in The New York Times Best Seller list for August 2011 and was a number one New York Times Hardcover Business Book bestseller in September of that year. In 2012 and 2013, Blair contributed several articles to Forbes Magazine's website.

As of 2012, ViSalus was valued at $600 million. Revenue subsequently declined and the company operated at a loss for 2013 and the first two-quarters of 2014. In 2012, Blair sold ViSalus for $792 million.

In 2016, Blair released his second book, titled 'Rock Bottom To Rock Star.'  The book focuses on teaching individuals how they can become rock-star entrepreneurs, by redefining what rock-star means.  "It isn't the celebrations that make you a rock star, it is the hard work" says Blair.

Philanthropy
The Blair Foundation, a nonprofit Ryan Blair founded, donates to programs that support at-risk kids and families. Through the Blair Foundation, he works closely with Urban Born, a non-profit company that helps at-risk youth and teens put an end to drug use and avoid gangs, while promoting education and healthy living.

References 

1977 births
21st-century American businesspeople
Living people
People associated with direct selling
Former gang members